Thelma Phoebe Mclean MBE (5 June 192125 December 2004), known professionally as Dolly Dyer  (formerly Mack) was an Australian Gold Logie winning radio and TV personality, and wife of fellow game-show host and performer Bob Dyer.

Early life
She was born and grew up in Sydney's eastern suburbs. Her father died when she was young and she was raised by her mother. The family nickname was "Mack" so she took the name Dolly Mack when she was employed as a showgirl in Sydney's Tivoli Theatre in 1940.

She met her husband there, literally running into him in a doorway. They married within two weeks at St John's, Darlinghurst, Sydney.

Entertainment career
During World War II, Dolly and Bob entertained Allied troops, including performing in South Pacific and New Guinea war zones.

After the war, Bob began the radio version of Pick a Box, which went to television in the late 50s. Dolly appeared with him, introducing contestants and being a sidekick to Bob's humour.

Retirement
They both retired in 1971, shortly before the last episode of Pick-a-Box was screened.

That year, Bob and Dolly were awarded a Special Gold Logie "in recognition of their contribution to Australian TV".

Honours 
Both were listed on the 1971 Queen's Birthday Honours list, with Dolly being appointed a Member of the Order of the British Empire (MBE). Bob was not eligible for a substantive award as he was an American citizen, but was appointed an Honorary Officer of the Order.

In retirement, Dolly and her husband found time for their shared love of deep-sea fishing. They both broke several records, with Dolly breaking a 12-year women's record for a black marlin weighing 297 kilograms.

After Bob's death in 1984, Dolly took up dancing, winning several medals for her performances.

Death
Dolly Dyer died of a stroke on Christmas Day, 2004. She was 83.

Notes

References
An elegant and affable TV sidekick - SMH.com.au
Dyer consequences: harbourfront estate to set a Mosman record - Brisbane Times
Eric Shackle's eBook - Dolly Dyer
TV pioneer Dolly Dyer dies - knowfirst.info | Wayback

1921 births
2004 deaths
Gold Logie winners
Australian game show hosts
Australian fishers
Australian Members of the Order of the British Empire